Aleksandr Ashotovich Markarov (born July 27, 1950) is a Russian professional football coach and a former player.

External links

1950 births
Living people
Footballers from Baku
Soviet footballers
Association football forwards
Russian people of Armenian descent
Russian footballers
Azerbaijani footballers
FC Anzhi Makhachkala players
Soviet football managers
Russian football managers
FC Anzhi Makhachkala managers
Russian Premier League managers
FC Dynamo Makhachkala players
Ethnic Armenian sportspeople
Soviet Armenians